The Grenville Regiment (Lisgar Rifles) was an infantry regiment of the Non-Permanent Active Militia of the Canadian Militia (now the Canadian Army). In 1936, the regiment was converted to artillery and would later become part of the 50th Field Artillery Regiment (The Prince of Wales Rangers), RCA (currently on the Supplementary Order of Battle).

Lineage

The Grenville Regiment (Lisgar Rifles) 

 Originated on 12 April 1867, in Prescott, Ontario, as the 56th Prescott Battalion of Infantry.
 Redesignated on 9 August 1867, as the 56th Grenville Battalion of Infantry.
 Redesignated on 13 September 1871, as the 56th Grenville Battalion of Rifles.
 Redesignated on 29 September 1871, as the 56th Grenville Battalion “Lisgar Rifles”.
 Redesignated on 8 May 1900, as the 56th Grenville Regiment "Lisgar Rifles".
 Redesignated on 12 March 1920, as The Grenville Regiment (Lisgar Rifles).
 Amalgamated on 15 December 1936, with the 56th Field Battery, RCA, and redesignated as the 56th (Grenville) Field Battery, (Howitzer), RCA.

Organization

56th Prescott Battalion of Infantry (12 April 1867) 

 No. 1 Company (first raised on 3 April 1856 as the 1st Prescott Rifle Company)
 No. 2 Company (first raised on 11 February 1857 as the 2nd Prescott Rifle Company)
 No. 3 Company (first raised on 30 January 1863 as the Burritt's Rapids Infantry Company)
 No. 4 Company (first raised on 8 June 1866 as the Millar's Corners Infantry Company) raised from the amalgamated companies of the Dundas County Militia
 No. 5 Company (first raised on 20 July 1866 as the Aultsville Infantry Company)
 No. 6 Company (first raised on 15 June 1866 as the Ottawa and Prescott Railway Infantry Company)

The Grenville Regiment (Lisgar Rifles) (15 February 1921) 

 1st Battalion (without perpetuation)
 2nd (Reserve) Battalion

References 

Former infantry regiments of Canada
Rifle regiments of Canada
Rifle regiments
Military units and formations of Ontario